The Four (Chinese: 少年四大名捕) is a 2015 Chinese television series starring Hans Zhang, Yang Yang, William Chan and Mao Zijun. It is the latest adaption of Woon Swee Oan's novel Si Da Ming Bu (四大名捕; The Four Great Constables). The series aired on Hunan TV from 17 March to 23 June 2015.

Synopsis
During the Ming Dynasty, there are four detective guards known for their supreme martial arts and keen insights in solving challenging murder mysteries. Leng Xie (Hans Zhang) saves a young girl named Chu Limo (Janine Chang), who is on the run from the imperial palace. Zhuge Zhengwo found out that Li Mo is Xia Hongyao's daughter, and took her under his care. Leng Xie and Li Mo initially did not get along, but their relationship slowly grows and took a meaningful turn through difficult times. An Shi Geng  (Mickey He) wants to get rid of the four detective guards, who has exposed his numerous crimes and evil deeds. He uses Yao Jihua (Jia Qing)'s jealousy of Leng Xie and Li Mo's relationship, to harm them. Together, the four detective guards work together to bring down An Shi Geng. At the same time, they each find their own happiness.

Cast

Main (The Four Constables) 
 Hans Zhang as Leng Xue
Prince of the Wolf tribe, and a skilled swordsman. He is cold and silent due to his turmoils and painful past. He initially had a rocky relationship with Chu Limo, but later fell in love with her.
 Yang Yang as Wu Qing
A calm, gentle and otherworldly gentleman. He specializes in using the fan and other hidden weapons. He gets into various romance entanglements with Nangong Ruyin, Chu Limo and Mu Xue, but wasn't able to achieve happiness.
 William Chan as Zhui Ming
An optimistic, cheerful and loyal man. He is an expert at Qing Gong, and loves to drink wine. He loves Princess Ziluo.
 Mao Zijun as Tie Shou 
A boxer who uses his iron fists as weapon. He possesses a royal demeanor and is also very helpful, constantly standing up against injustice. He loves Ling Yiyi.

Supporting 
 Janine Chang as Chu Limo / Chu Ying Xue
Xia Hongyao's daughter. She possesses a talented gift for reading people's minds. While escaping from the imperial's palace's beauty draft, she was saved by Leng Xue and becomes a maid at Shen Hou mansion.
 Mickey He as An Shidi 
The main antagonist, responsible for all the evil deeds; including the murder of Leng Xue's family. He wants to become the Emperor to seek revenge for his lover, Hu Die. He uses the Soul pill to control the four villains, Wen Ruyu and Wen Wuchang, and manipulates them to achieve his goals.
Emma Wu as Ling Yiyi 
A simple-minded and loyal girl, who can do anything for the man she loves. She is used by enemies and her body becomes poisonous. 
Jia Qing as Ji Yaohua 
Fierce and stubborn, her father’s official rank makes it easier for her to become a leading female guard. Being in love and betrothed to Leng Xue, his blooming love with Li Mo leaves her susceptible to An Shidi's schemes.
Huang Wenhao as Zhuge Zhenwo
The teacher of Leng Xue, Wu Qing, Zhui Ming and Tie Shou. He discovers Chu Limo and taught her the art of reading minds, passed down from Xia Hongyao. 
Hao Zejia as Nu Nu 
Leng Xue's childhood friend and foster sister. A descendant of the wolf tribe. 
Meng Yixuan as Nangong Ruyan
Wu Qing's love interest. She was later forced to become An Shidi's wife due to her resemblance with Die Wu.
Wang Shuang as Mu Xue
Princess of Qing Ge Tribe. She admires Wu Qing. 
Jiang Yuchen as Princess Ziluo
The Imperial Princess. Unruly and capricious; she initially fell in love with Leng Xue, but later develops a relationship with Zhui Ming.

Extended
Yang Mingna as Jiao Yang (Zhuge Zhenwo's love interest, Ming Yue Lou's lady boss)
Chen Yun as Ye'er (Li Mo's good friend, a servant at Shen Hou's mansion)
Wang Haiyang as Yu Chuntong (Leader of Liu Shan Men, An Shidi's confidante)
Liu Xin as Liu Chunping (Shen Hou Mansion's head servant. She likes Leng Xie and Wu Qing) 
Zhou Shaodong as Prince Xiang
Qian Yongchen as Yan Zhao (One of the four villains)
Zhou Muyin as Tang Chou (One of the four villains)
Ma Wenlong as Shu Wan (One of the four villains)
Cheng Cheng as Zhao Hao (One of the four villains)
Li Tengjing as Wen Ruyu (The synonym of death. He often concocts poison to harm people)
Ma Kui as Wen Wuchang (Wen Ruyu's son)
Ying Haoming as Mo Erchi (Crown Prince of a tribe. He likes Li Mo)
Liu Sitong as Xia Hongyao (Li Mo's mother, a nun at Sheng Yue sect who specializes in reading people's minds. She previously had a relationship with Leng Xie's father)
Qiu Yueli as Chu Yanliang (Li Mo's father)
Meng Yixuan as Die Wu (An Shidi's love interest)

Special appearances
He Jiayi as Ah Qi Na (leader of Sheng Yue sect)
Michelle Bai as Nine-tailed Fox 
Han Dong as Zhang Sheng (Nine-tailed fox's husband)
Liu Changde as Zhao Jinlong
Zhang Meng as Hui Lan (Zhao Jinlong's wife)
Zheng Shuang as Wen Bing'er (Wen Ruyi's niece, a disabled physician) 
Huang Ming as Master Du (A man in love with Ziluo, but was used by her as a pawn to make Zhui Ming jealous) 
Zong Fengyan as Master Wu Hen (A playboy and womanizer)

Soundtrack

Reception
The drama is a commercial success. It maintained the number one spot in its timeslot during broadcast, with an average viewership rating of 0.729% (CSM50) and 0.82% (nationwide). The series was especially popular with the younger audiences due to its main cast of flower boys.

Ratings 

 Highest ratings are marked in red, lowest ratings are marked in blue

Broadcast

References

External links

Chinese wuxia television series
2015 Chinese television series debuts
Hunan Television dramas
Adaptations of works by Woon Swee Oan
Television series by H&R Century Pictures
2015 Chinese television series endings